Bolshaya Sadovaya Street or  Big Garden Street is the main street in Rostov-on-Don. Rostov City Hall, Rostov State Musical Theater, Southern Federal University, Chernova House and other notable buildings are located on this street. The street is parallel to the Don River.

History 
The street was formed in the late 18th century. At the beginning of the 19th century some gardens appeared along the street. Therefore, the street was named Bolshaya Sadovaya (Big Garden Street). In the late 19th century it became the central street of the city. A lot of banks, hotels, shops and private houses were built there at that time. In 1901 the first electric tram was launched in the street.

In Soviet times, the street was named after Friedrich Engels. During the World War II, many houses of the street were destroyed.

Notable buildings and structures

References 

Streets in Rostov-on-Don